The Heyday of the Insensitive Bastards is a 2015 American anthology film based on the book by Robert Boswell. It consists of seven vignettes. It premiered at the 2015 Atlanta Film Festival.

Vignettes

A Walk In Winter
The first is A Walk In Winter directed by Ryan Moody, written by Jessica Nikkel:

Conrad comes back to his small town to learn they have located the bones of his missing mother.  He is asked to watch the police station and he discovers that the body is that of his father and not his mother.

Cast:
 James Franco as Conrad
 Abigail Spencer as Abigail
 Jack Kehler as Sheriff

Guests
The second is Guests directed by Mark Columbus, written by Neville Kiser:

Charlie attends his first day of class at his new school only to be bullied by Bobby.  Dad is at home dying of cancer so Charlie tells Mom and Dad that all went well at school.  As time passes Dad eventually dies.  The next day Charlie goes to school and beats up Bobby.

Cast:
 Rico Rodriguez as Charlie Foster - New student
 Matthew Modine as Theodore Foster - Father
 Priscilla Garita as Maricelle Foster - Mother
 Tanner Buchaman as Bobby Bell - Bully

Almost Not Beautiful
The third is Almost Not Beautiful directed by Sarah Kruchowski, written by Jacqueline Vleck:

Lisa comes home to find her dysfunctional family unchanged.  Mom still tolerates step-dad, Sydney who like to play pocket pool with his hand in his pocket.  Sister Amanda is drunk and has attempted suicide twice.  Lisa tells Amanda that "you're prettier than I am" and that is to make everything ok.

Cast:
 Kate Mara as Lisa - Sister
 Amber Tamblyn as Amanda - Sister

Miss Famous
The fourth is Miss Famous directed by Shadae Lamar Smith, written by Roxanne Beck:

Monica is a maid who has a young daughter Sally. As Monica meets people and cleans their houses, she is going to use their life experiences to write a book and become famous.

Cast: 
 Kristen Wiig as Monica - Maid
 Tony Cox as Mr. Chub - Customer
 Jimmy Kimmel as Lunchtime creeper in park
 Maya Zapata as Babysitter

Lacunae
The fifth is Lacunae directed by Vanita Shastry, written by Mona Nahm:

Son Paul comes home to visit his parents because Dad recently had a stroke. At dinner both Mom and Dad encourage Paul to visit his former wife who has had a son since the divorce. Despite Paul's assurances that he is not the father, they tell him that Cliff, the "grandchild", sure looks like him. Taking Dad for a ride, he drives by Laura's house. Later he goes back, meets Cliff and talks to Laura. He gives the boy a carved wooden horse. Laura tells Paul she had dated a guy that sure looked like him.  Paul goes home and asks his parents whether they think Paul should start seeing Laura again?

Cast: 
 Natalie Portman as Laura
 Jim Parrack as Paul

Smoke
Sixth is Smoke directed by Simon Savelyev, written by Nicole Riegel:

Three teen boys smoke cigarettes and each tell their own real or imagined first sexual experience.

Cast:
 Keir Gilchrist as Michael
 Thomas Mann as Lee
 Bo Mitchell as Greg

The Heyday of the Insensitive Bastards
Seventh is The Heyday of the Insensitive Bastards directed by Jeremy David White, written by Marissa Matteo:

Keen comes home from college and attends a pool party with much alcohol and drugs. Keen and Lila are sitting next to the pool and drunk Barnett throws-up in Lila's lap. Keen gives him a hard punch and told to get away. Later they notice Barnett hasn't moved and Keen pisses on his face. He still is not awake so they throw him in the pool. Barnett is dead. Lila agrees to have sex with Keen if he tells no one. He agrees and they have sex. Keen gives the dog some mushrooms, but it too dies. They bury the dog. Keen asks Lila to marry him and she decides to call the police about Barnett.

Cast:
 Jacob Loeb as Keen
 Kelsey Ford as Lila
 Tyler Labine as Clete
 Wilmer Calderon as Barnett
 Robert Dubois as Stu

References

External links

2015 films
American anthology films
2010s English-language films